Chashan is a town of Liling City in Hunan Province, China. The town was established by merging the historic Shenfugang Town and the historic Lishanba Town on November 26, 2015. As of 2015, it had a population of 66,100 and an area of 166.82 square kilometers.

Cityscape
The town is divided into 12 villages and 3 communities, the following areas: Lishanba Community, Longjing Community, Chashan Community, Dashiqiao Village, Lengshui Village, Nantang Village, Chaxi Village, Shijuntang Village, Nanyuan Village, Changma Village, Meixiao Village, Shanghu Village, Shuangpang Village, Donggang Village, and Yingtian Village.

References

External links

Divisions of Liling